Paraterpna is a monotypic moth genus in the family Geometridae. It consists of only one species, Paraterpna harrisoni, which is found in New South Wales, Australia. Both the genus and species were first described by Gilbert M. Goldfinch in 1929.

The larvae feed on Leptospermum species.

References

External links

Pseudoterpnini
Monotypic moth genera
Moths described in 1929
Moths of Australia